The  doubles Tournament at the 2007 Generali Ladies Linz took place between 22 and 28 October on the indoor hard courts of the TipsArena Linz in Linz, Austria. Cara Black and Liezel Huber won the title, defeating Katarina Srebotnik and Ai Sugiyama in the final.

Seeds

Draw

References
 Main Draw

Generali Ladies Linz - Doubles